FC Schalke 04 had a surprise title tilt at Bundesliga, in spite of a poor start to the season and the resultant dismissal of manager Jupp Heynckes. With largely unproven Ralf Rangnick taking over, Schalke went about level with title rivals Bayern Munich after a 1–0 win thanks to a goal from Lincoln. From there on, Bayern dominated, leaving Schalke a full 14 points behind, albeit good enough for runners-up, qualifying the team for the Champions League.

First-team squad
Squad at end of season

Left club during season

Competitions

Bundesliga

League table

DFB-Pokal

Final

UEFA Intertoto Cup

Third round

Semi-finals

Final

UEFA Cup

First round

Group stage

Knockout phase

=Round of 32

References

Notes

FC Schalke 04 seasons
Schalke 04